Robert "Rob" Karl Baldwin Grabert (born 5 February 1964 in Hilfarth, West Germany) is a retired volleyball player from the Netherlands, who represented his home country at two Summer Olympics: in 1988 and 1996.  His finest hour came in 1996, when he won the gold medal in Atlanta, Georgia with the Dutch Men's National Team by defeating archrivals Italy in the final (3-2).

References
  Dutch Olympic Committee

1964 births
Living people
Dutch men's volleyball players
Volleyball players at the 1988 Summer Olympics
Volleyball players at the 1996 Summer Olympics
Olympic volleyball players of the Netherlands
Olympic gold medalists for the Netherlands
Olympic medalists in volleyball
People from Heinsberg (district)
Sportspeople from Cologne (region)
Medalists at the 1996 Summer Olympics
20th-century Dutch people
21st-century Dutch people